Francis E. Mangiapane (August 5, 1925 – July 31, 2005) was an American professional basketball player. He played for the New York Knicks in the second half of the 1946–47 BAA season.

BAA career statistics

Regular season

References

External links
NYU Hall of Fame profile

1925 births
2005 deaths
American men's basketball players
Basketball players from New York City
George Washington Educational Campus alumni
Guards (basketball)
New York Knicks players
NYU Violets baseball players
NYU Violets football players
NYU Violets men's basketball players
Paterson Crescents players
Undrafted National Basketball Association players